Duck, You Sucker! (lit. "Duck Your Head", "Get Down"), also known as A Fistful of Dynamite and Once Upon a Time ... the Revolution, is a 1971 epic Zapata Western film directed and co-written by Sergio Leone and starring Rod Steiger, James Coburn, and Romolo Valli.

Set during the Mexican Revolution of the 1910s, the film tells the story of Juan Miranda, an amoral Mexican outlaw, and John Mallory, a former member of the Irish Volunteer Army. After they accidentally meet under less-than-friendly circumstances, Juan and John involuntarily become heroes of the Revolution, despite being forced to make heavy sacrifices.

It is the second film of Leone's unofficial Once Upon a Time Trilogy, which includes the previous Once Upon a Time in the West (1968) and the subsequent Once Upon a Time in America (1984). The last western film directed by Leone, it is considered by some to be one of his most overlooked films.

Plot 
In Revolution-torn 1913 Mexico, Juan Miranda, a Mexican outlaw leading a bandit family, robs a coach of wealthy men and rapes a female passenger who insulted him. Passing by on a motorcycle is John H. Mallory, an early Irish Republican explosives expert, who is working in Mexico as a silver prospector. Juan discovers his skill with dynamite and nitroglycerin and asks John (who initially states his name as "Seán") to help him rob the Mesa Verde National Bank. After John initially refuses, Juan frames him for the murder of his employer and several soldiers, making him a wanted criminal and offering to "protect" him in exchange for his help. John reluctantly agrees to help Juan rob the bank, but escapes on the way to Mesa Verde.

Arriving in the city before Juan, John makes contact with Mexican revolutionaries led by physician Dr. Villega and agrees to use his explosives in their service. When Juan arrives, John inducts him into the revolutionaries' ranks. The bank is hit as part of an orchestrated attack on the Mexican army. Juan, interested only in the bank's money, is shocked to find that it has no funds and is instead being used by the army as a political prison. John, Juan and his family end up freeing hundreds of prisoners, inadvertently (and against his wishes) causing Juan to become a "great, grand, glorious hero of the revolution".

The revolutionaries are chased into the hills by an army detachment led by Colonel Günther Reza. John and Juan volunteer to stay behind with two machine guns and dynamite. Much of the Mexican army's detachment is destroyed while crossing a bridge, which is blown up by John. Colonel Reza, who commands an armored car, survives. After the battle, John and Juan find most of their comrades, including Juan's father and children, have been killed by the army in a cave which served as the rebels' hideout. Grief-stricken and enraged, Juan goes out to fight the army single-handed and is captured. John sneaks into camp, where he witnesses executions of many of his fellow revolutionaries by firing squad. They had been informed on by Dr. Villega, who has been tortured by Colonel Reza and his men. This evokes in John memories of a similar betrayal by Nolan, his best friend in Ireland. After Nolan identified John, John killed two British soldiers and then killed Nolan, making him a fugitive and forcing him to flee Ireland. Juan faces a firing squad of his own, but John arrives and blows up the wall with dynamite just in time. They escape on John's motorcycle.

John and Juan hide in the animal coach of a train. It stops to pick up the tyrannical Governor Don Jaime, who is fleeing (with a small fortune) from the revolutionary forces belonging to Pancho Villa and Emiliano Zapata. As the train is ambushed, John, as a test of Juan's loyalty, lets him choose between shooting the Governor and accepting a bribe from him. Juan kills Jaime, also stealing the Governor's spoils. As the doors to the coach open, Juan is greeted by a large crowd and once again is unexpectedly hailed as a great hero of the revolution. The money is taken away by revolutionary General Santerna.

On a train with commanders of the revolution, John and Juan are joined by Dr. Villega, who has escaped. John alone knows of Villega's betrayal. They learn that Pancho Villa's forces will be delayed by 24 hours and that an army train carrying 1,000 soldiers and heavy weapons, led by Colonel Reza, will be arriving in a few hours that evening, which will surely overpower the rebel position. John suggests they rig a locomotive with dynamite and send it head on. He requires one other man, but instead of picking Juan, who volunteers, he chooses Dr. Villega. It becomes clear to Villega that John knows of the betrayal, but John says he used to judge people but he doesn't anymore. John pleads with him to jump off the locomotive before it hits the army's train, but Villega feels guilty and stays on board. John jumps in time and the two trains collide and explode, killing Villega and a number of Mexican soldiers.

The revolutionaries' ambush is successful, but as John approaches to meet Juan, he is shot in the back by Colonel Reza. An enraged Juan guns down the Colonel with a machine gun. As John lies dying, he continues to have memories of Nolan, and of a young woman they both apparently loved. Juan kneels by his side to ask about Dr. Villega. John keeps the doctor's secret and tells Juan that he died a hero of the revolution. As Juan goes to seek help, the fatally wounded John, knowing his end is near, sets off a second charge he secretly laid in case the battle went bad. Horrified by his friend's sudden death, Juan stares at John's burning remains, before turning to the camera and asking forlornly, "What about me?"

Cast 
 Rod Steiger as Juan Miranda, an amoral Mexican peon leading a band of outlaws composed mostly of his own children. He does not care about the revolution at first, but becomes involved after his encounter with John.
 James Coburn as John (Seán) H. Mallory, a Fenian revolutionary and explosives expert. Wanted for killing British forces in Ireland, he flees to Mexico where he ends up getting involved in another revolution.
 Romolo Valli as Dr. Villega, a physician and commander of the revolutionary movement of Mesa Verde.
 Maria Monti as Adelita, a wealthy female passenger on the stagecoach robbed by Juan at the beginning of the film.
 Rik Battaglia as General Santerna, a commander leading the Mexican revolutionary army.
 Franco Graziosi as Governor Don Jaime, the corrupt and tyrannical local governor.
 Antoine Saint-John as Colonel Günther Reza, a ruthless commander leading a detachment of Federales and the main antagonist of the film.
 Vivienne Chandler as Coleen, John's girlfriend; appears only in flashbacks.
 David Warbeck as Nolan, John's best friend, also an Irish nationalist; appears only in flashbacks.

Production

Development 
The development of Duck, You Sucker! began during the production of Once Upon a Time in the West, when Sergio Leone's collaborator Sergio Donati presented him with an early treatment of the film. Around the same time, political riots had broken out in Paris, and the ideals of revolution and left-wing nationalism had become popular among university students and filmmakers across Europe. Leone, who had used his previous films to deconstruct the romanticization of the American Old West, decided to use Duck, You Sucker! to deconstruct the romanticized nature of revolution, and to shed light on the political instability of contemporary Italy.

Leone, Donati and Luciano Vincenzoni worked together on the film's screenplay for three to four weeks, discussing characters and scenes for the film. Donati, who had previously acted as an uncredited script doctor for The Good, the Bad and the Ugly, conceived Juan Miranda's character as an extension of Tuco from The Good, the Bad and the Ugly. Meanwhile, Leone was largely responsible for the character of John Mallory, and the film's focus on the development of John and Juan's friendship. At times, however, Leone, Donati, and Vincenzoni found that they had highly differing opinions about how the film should be made, with Leone wanting to have the film produced on a large scale with an epic quality, while Donati and Vincenzoni perceived the film as a low-budget thriller.

Leone never intended to direct Duck, You Sucker!, and wanted the film to be directed by someone who could replicate his visual style. Peter Bogdanovich, his original choice for director, soon abandoned the film due to perceived lack of control. Sam Peckinpah then agreed to direct the film after Bogdanovich's departure, only to be turned down for financial reasons by United Artists. Donati and Vincenzoni, noting the director's frequent embellishment of the facts concerning his films, claim that Peckinpah did not even consider it - Donati stated that Peckinpah was "too shrewd to be produced by a fellow director". Leone then recruited his regular assistant director, Giancarlo Santi, to direct, with Leone supervising proceedings, and Santi was in charge for the first ten days of shooting. However, Rod Steiger refused to play his role as Juan unless Leone himself directed, and the producers pressured him into directing the film. Leone reluctantly agreed, and Santi was relegated to second unit work.

The inspiration for the firing squad scene came from Francisco Goya, and in particular from his set of prints The Disasters of War. Leone showed the prints to director of photography Giuseppe Ruzzolini in order to get the lighting and color effects he wanted. The film is believed to have been influenced by Peckinpah's The Wild Bunch, and it shares some plot elements with Pat Garrett and Billy the Kid, a western film also starring Coburn and released a year later. Leone biographer and film historian Sir Christopher Frayling noted that Duck, You Sucker! was made in a period of Italian cinema where filmmakers were 'rethinking' their relationship with fascism and the Nazi occupation of Rome. He has identified numerous references to both World Wars in the film, such as Colonel Reza's commanding of an armored car resembling a Nazi tank commander, the massacre of Juan's family (which bears similarities to the Ardeatine massacre of 1944), and an execution victim resembling Benito Mussolini.

Casting 
Casting the lead roles of Duck, You Sucker! proved to be a difficult process. The role of John Mallory was written for Jason Robards, who had played Cheyenne in Once Upon a Time in the West, but the studio wanted a bigger name for his character. Clint Eastwood was then approached by Leone for the role, but he saw it as just a different take of the same character he had already played in the Dollars Trilogy, and he also wanted to end his association with the Italian film industry. As a result, he declined the offer and starred in Hang 'Em High instead. George Lazenby was then approached to play John, but he declined. A young Malcolm McDowell, then mostly known for his performance in if...., was considered for both John and Nolan, John's Irish friend, but Leone eventually settled on James Coburn to play John. Coburn had previously been considered for other Leone projects, including A Fistful of Dollars and Once Upon a Time in the West. He had also previously been considered for a role in another United Artists-financed Zapata Western, Sergio Corbucci's The Mercenary, but Franco Nero was later cast in what was originally his role.

The role of Juan Miranda was written for Eli Wallach, based on his performance of Tuco in The Good, the Bad and the Ugly, but Wallach had already committed to another project with Jean-Paul Belmondo. After Leone begged Wallach to play the part, he dropped out of the other project to play Juan. However, Rod Steiger owed the studio another film and they refused to back the picture unless Steiger was used. Leone offered no compensation to Wallach, and Wallach subsequently sued.

Leone was initially dissatisfied with Steiger's performance in that he played his character as a serious, Zapata-like figure. As a result, tensions rose between Steiger and Leone numerous times, including an incident that ended with Steiger walking off during the filming of the scene when John destroys Juan's stagecoach. After the film's completion, Leone and Steiger were content with the final result, and Steiger was known to praise Leone for his skills as a director.

Filming 

Exterior filming mostly took place in Andalusia, southern Spain. Some of the locations used previously featured in Leone's Dollar Trilogy films; for example, the Almería Railway Station, used for the train sequence in For a Few Dollars More, returns in this film as Mesa Verde's station. The flashback scenes with Sean and friends were shot in Ireland at Howth Castle in Dublin, and Toner's Pub on Baggot Street, Dublin. As filming progressed, Leone modified the script: as he did not originally plan on directing Duck, You Sucker, he thought the script was "conceived for an American filmmaker". Duck, You Sucker! was one of the last mainstream films shot in Techniscope.

Music 
The musical score for Duck, You Sucker! was composed by Ennio Morricone, who collaborated with Leone in all his previous projects as a director with the exception of his debut, The Colossus of Rhodes. Elvis Mitchell, former film critic for The New York Times, considered it as one of Morricone's "most glorious and unforgettable scores". He also sees "Invention for John", which plays over the opening credits and is essentially the film's theme, "as epic and truly wondrous as anything Morricone ever did". A soundtrack album was released in the United States in 1972, and many tracks can be found in Morricone's compilation albums. Music was recorded in April 1971 and second recording sessions in August/September the same year. A 35th anniversary OST was issued in 2006 with previously never released recording session and alternate takes.

Themes 
Despite the politically charged setting, Duck, You Sucker! was not intended as a political film: Leone himself said that the Mexican Revolution in the film is meant only as a symbol, not as a representation of the real one, and that it was chosen because of its fame and its relationship with cinema, and he contends that the real theme of the film is friendship:

Another theme is amoral non-engagement: Juan is very loyal to his family (consisting of his six children, each from a different mother), but he cannot be trusted by anyone else. He is also very cynical about priests, and he doesn't care about codified law. This relates most closely to those aspects of Southern Italian life observed by Edward Banfield and others.

The film also explores the relationship between Mexican bandits and peasant communities at the time of the revolution, idealized by figures like Juan José Herrera and Elfego Baca, which Leone may have had in mind in his creation of the character of Juan.

Release and reaction

Performance 
The film was moderately successful in Italy, where it grossed 1,829,402,000 lire on its first run; it was the third-highest grossing Spaghetti Western at the Italian box office that year, behind Trinity is Still My Name (which overtook For a Few Dollars More as the highest-grossing film ever released in Italy at that time) and Red Sun. Although it was the lowest-grossing of Leone's five Westerns in Italy by a notable margin, it was also the highest-grossing Zapata Western released there. In France, it was the fourth most popular film released there in 1972, behind A Clockwork Orange, Stadium Nuts and Last Tango in Paris.

Reception 
Duck, You Sucker! failed to gain any substantial recognition from the critics at the time of debut, especially compared to Leone's other films, though he did win the David di Donatello for Best Director. Since then, however, it has received a more favorable reception: on review aggregator Rotten Tomatoes, the holds an approval rating of 92% based on 24 reviews, with an average rating of 7.40/10. The website's critical consensus reads, "Duck, You Sucker is a saucy helping of spaghetti western, with James Coburn and Rod Steiger's chemistry igniting the screen and Sergio Leone's bravura style on full display". The Chicago Reader praised it for its "marvelous sense of detail and spectacular effects". The New York Observer argues that Leone's direction, Morricone's score and the leads' performance "ignite an emotional explosion comparable to that of Once Upon a Time in the West". In Mexico, where the film is known as Los Héroes de Mesa Verde, it was refused classification and effectively banned until 1979 because it was considered offensive to the Mexican people and the Revolution.

Release history 

The film was originally released in the United States in 1972 as Duck, You Sucker!, and ran for 121 minutes. Many scenes were cut because they were deemed too violent, profane or politically sensitive, including a quote from Mao Zedong about the nature of revolutions and class struggle. Theatrical prints were generally of poor quality, and the film was marketed as a light-hearted spiritual successor to the Dollars Trilogy, not at all as Leone intended, and it did not succeed in gaining press notice. In part because of this, United Artists reissued the film under the new name of A Fistful of Dynamite, meant to recall the notoriety of A Fistful of Dollars. According to Peter Bogdanovich, the original title Duck, You Sucker! was meant by Leone as a close translation of the Italian title Giù la testa, coglione! (translated: "Duck your head, dumbass!"), which he contended to be a common American colloquialism. The expletive coglione (a vulgar way to say "testicle") was later removed to avoid censorship issues. One of the working titles, Once Upon a Time... the Revolution, was also used for some European releases.

In 1989, Image Entertainment released the film on laserdisc, including some material cut from the original US version and lasting 138 minutes. This version was released in Europe as Once Upon a Time in Mexico, again intended to evoke an earlier Leone film, Once Upon a Time in the West.

Subsequent re-releases have largely used the title A Fistful of Dynamite, although the DVD appearing in The Sergio Leone Anthology box set, released by MGM in 2007, used the original English language title of Duck, You Sucker!.

The film's first English language DVD was released by MGM in the UK in 2003. This version of the film runs 154 minutes and is almost complete, but it uses a truncated version of the film's final four-minute-long flashback. In 2005, following the restoration of Leone's The Good, the Bad and the Ugly, MGM re-released the film in the UK with more supplemental material, the aforementioned flashback scene reinstated and with a newly created 5.1 surround soundtrack. The restored version had a brief art house theatrical run in the U.S. and was subsequently released there in a "Collector's Edition" in 2007. The remastered surround tracks have attracted criticism online for the replacement of certain music cues throughout the film (most prominently during the last two flashback scenes and the end credits) and for censoring at least two expletives from the film's soundtrack. Furthermore, it has been reported that the mono soundtrack included on the 2007 Collector's Edition is not the original mix, but simply a fold-down of the surround remaster.

Duck, You Sucker! was shown in 2009 as part of the Cannes Classics series of the 62nd Cannes Film Festival. The print used for the festival was restored by the Cineteca di Bologna and the film laboratory Immagine Ritrovata.

In October 2014, MGM released the film on Blu-ray, akin to its Blu-ray releases of the Dollars Trilogy.

References

External links 
 
 
 
 
 Duck, You Sucker! at Trailers from Hell
 Duck You Sucker! at the blog Come Here to Me! about Dublin

1971 films
1971 Western (genre) films
Films scored by Ennio Morricone
Films directed by Sergio Leone
Films set in the 1910s
Films set in Mexico
Films shot in Ireland
Italian buddy films
Italian epic films
Italian sequel films
Mexican Revolution films
Films with screenplays by Luciano Vincenzoni
Films with screenplays by Sergio Donati
Films with screenplays by Sergio Leone
Spaghetti Western films
Spanish epic films
United Artists films
Films shot in Almería
1970s Italian films
Western (genre) epic films